Gollapadu-Muppalla (Muppalla) is a village in Guntur district of the Indian state of Andhra Pradesh. It is located in Muppalla mandal of Guntur revenue division.

Geography 

Governance 

Muppalla gram panchayat is the local self-government of the village. It is divided into wards and each ward is represented by a ward member.

Education 

As per the school information report for the academic year 2018–19, the village has 9 schools. These are 4 Zilla Parishad/MPP, one KGBV, one other type and 3 private schools.

See also 
List of villages in Guntur district

References 

Villages in Guntur district